Manolo Sanlúcar (born Manuel Muñoz Alcón, 24 November 1943 – 27 August 2022) was a Spanish flamenco composer and guitarist. He was considered one of the most important Spanish composers of recent times, and together with Paco de Lucía, Tomatito, and Vicente Amigo, one of the main figures in the evolution of the flamenco guitar.

Sanlúcar's teacher was his father, Isidro Sanlúcar, a baker and old-style guitarist, who frequently came home with people who were fond of cante and playing; from his childhood he was exceptionally skilled to follow in his steps. His brothers also decided on the same vocation, among them Isidro.

Sanlúcar soon began to research, aware that the guitar had infinite possibilities that had hardly been explored. The most ambitious of his contributions to the art was his constant striving to integrate flamenco in symphonic music. Several works of the greatest interest which have placed his name among the great composers of our time include: Fantasía para guitarra y orquesta, Trebujena, Medea and Soleá, showing his attempts to merge his primary focus in music, and which toured the world as a ballet; Tauromagia or Aljibe. Some of them were recorded.

"I wish the experts in universal music to understand that they may approach flamenco, so they do not consider it something tribal and topical, so they see a branch of music in flamenco that allows very profound musical analysis and has extraordinary poetic and musical quality".

Discussing it further, he later declared,

"Flamenco is a philosophy, the way of thinking and feeling of a whole people and its historical tradition. That is why I feel the need to tell more things about flamenco with other sounds and I take to the orchestra and try to get the orchestra to play siguiriyas, but take note, not for the orchestra to accompany siguiriyas and a singer, but for the orchestra to take on the feeling of the flamenco and, as if it were a sole instrument, to tell that spirit and magic sound of flamenco".

Sanlúcar also composed a sort of flamenco opera on an idea by Lebrijano, to be played on the stage, although it was produced: Ven y Sígueme.

Two of his most critically acclaimed records are Tauromagia (1988), and Locura de Brisa y Trino. (2000)
He performed in some films.

Sanlúcar was awarded Spain's Premio Nacional de Música for interpretation in 2000.

Discography
 1968: Recital Flamenco 
 1970: Inspiraciones
1971: Peineta Cubana
 1971: Mundo Y Formas De La Guitarra Flamenca Vol. I 
 1971: Mundo Y Formas De La Guitarra Flamenca Vol. II
 1972: Mundo Y Formas De La Guitarra Flamenca Vol. III
 1975:  1975: Manola Sanlucar King of Flamenco Guitar CBS
 1976: Sentimiento 
 1977: Fantasía Para Guitarra Y Orquesta 1978: ...Y Regresarte (Homenaje A Miguel Hernandez) 1979: Manolo Sanúcar En Japón 1980: Candela 1981: Azahares 1982: Al Viento 1982: Ven Y Sigueme 1984: Trebujena 1985: Testamento Andaluz 1987: Medea 1987: Dos guitarras flamencas (with Sabicas)
 1988: Tauromagia 1989: Solea 1992: Aljibe 
 2000: Locura De Brisa Y Trino''

References

External links
Mano Sanlúcar.com

 

1943 births
2022 deaths
Spanish flamenco guitarists
Spanish male guitarists
Musicians from Andalusia
People from Sanlúcar de Barrameda